Victor Lenard James Simpson (born 26 February 1960) is a former New Zealand rugby union player. A centre, Simpson represented Poverty Bay briefly and then Canterbury at a provincial level, and was a member of the New Zealand national side, the All Blacks, in 1985. He played four matches for the All Blacks including two internationals against Argentina.

Simpon is the stepfather of rugby player Stephen Brett.

References

1960 births
Living people
Rugby union players from Gisborne, New Zealand
People educated at Gisborne Boys' High School
University of Canterbury alumni
New Zealand rugby union players
New Zealand international rugby union players
Canterbury rugby union players
Rugby union centres
Māori All Blacks players